Wendy Hoopes (born 4 November 1972) is an American actress most widely celebrated for her roles on MTV's animated series Daria, where she provided the voices for three different main characters (Jane Lane, Helen Morgendorffer, and Quinn Morgendorffer).

Life and career
Hoopes was born in Kuala Lumpur, Malaysia and was the fourth of five children in her family. She spent her childhood travelling overseas, particularly to America, where she received her Bachelor of Fine Arts degree at New York University's Tisch School of the Arts. Her first major acting accomplishment was her creation of the character Bee Bee in Eric Bogosian's production SubUrbia at Lincoln Street.

Her next notable achievement was receiving multiple roles on Daria, an animated series that ran on MTV for five years. She and actor Marc Thompson were considered the two "stand out" voice talents of the series, for they each provided the voices for numerous different characters.

Since Daria ended in 2002, Hoopes has made guest appearances on many television shows, including Law & Order: Criminal Intent, Hey Joel, The Wrong Coast, The Jury, LAX, Judging Amy, Third Watch, Sex and the City, Law & Order, Swift Justice, Brotherhood, and New York Undercover. Her film credits include Private Parts, Better Living, Killing Cinderella, Calling Bobcat, Roadblock, Spinster and The Sitter.

She has also featured in many theatre productions, including a rock musical about Janis Joplin, and she provided the voice for Mona Sax in the video game Max Payne 2: The Fall of Max Payne and  Max Payne 3.

Filmography

Film

Television

Video games

References

External links

1972 births
20th-century American actresses
21st-century American actresses
Malaysian emigrants to the United States
American film actresses
American stage actresses
American television actresses
American video game actresses
American voice actresses
Living people
Tisch School of the Arts alumni